Michael Donnell Niles (born March 31, 1955) is an American former professional basketball player. He was selected in the 1979 NBA draft by the Philadelphia 76ers, although he played for the Phoenix Suns in 44 games during the 1980–81 season. Niles scored 115 points in his NBA career. He also played for the Lancaster Red Roses of the Continental Basketball Association after his stint with the Suns.

On January 24, 1989, Niles was convicted of killing his wife.

References

1955 births
Living people
American men's basketball players
Basketball players from Los Angeles
Cal State Fullerton Titans men's basketball players
Jefferson High School (Los Angeles) alumni
Lancaster Red Roses (CBA) players
Philadelphia 76ers draft picks
Phoenix Suns players
Small forwards